Voiceless is a 2015 American Christian psychological thriller film written and directed by Pat Necerato and starring Rusty Joiner, Jocelyn Cruz, Victoria Gates, and James Russo. It was given a limited release in the United States on 7 October 2016. It was heavily panned by both critics and audiences.

Premise 
Jesse Dean, a young, reserved war veteran, risks his marriage, new ministry job and his sanity by opposing an abortion clinic in his Philadelphia neighborhood.

Cast
 Rusty Joiner as Jesse Dean
 Jocelyn Cruz as Julia 
 Victoria Gates as Alexis
 James Russo as Pastor Gil
 Paul Rodriguez as Virgil Adorable
 Susan Moses as Miss Elsie

Production 
Filming took place between 18 August and 30 September 2014.

Reception

Box office
Opening on a hundred screens in a limited release, the film grossed about $250,000 on its opening weekend. By the end of 2016, it had grossed a total of $418,940.
The film won 2 Best Feature Film Awards at the Northeastern Film Festival and the California Film Awards, along with several Best Actor Wins for Rusty Joiner, the lead, and Victoria Gates for Best Supporting Actress

Critical reception
Kristian Lin of Fort  Worth Weekly, in a review titled "Voiceless: Abort! Abort!", wrote that the film "has a gritty Northeastern urban setting with a modicum of nonwhite characters, and it plays with the element of doubt with its main character. If only it added up to a good movie."

References

External links
 
 
 

2015 films
2015 drama films
American drama films
American independent films
Films about Christianity
Films about evangelicalism
Films about religion
Films about abortion
2015 independent films
2010s English-language films
2010s American films